Stepney was a constituency used for elections to the London County Council between 1889 and 1919, and again from 1949 until the council's abolition, in 1965.  The seat shared boundaries with the UK Parliament constituency of the same name.

Councillors

Election results

1889–1919

1949–1965

References

London County Council constituencies
Politics of the London Borough of Tower Hamlets
Stepney